The U.S. Post Office, also known as the Federal Building, is a post office located at 401 W. 18th St. in Merced, California. The post office was built in 1933 as part of a public works program started by Herbert Hoover. The building was designed by Los Angeles architects Allison & Allison in the Mediterranean Revival style; its design includes a tile roof, stucco walls, and arched windows with terra cotta surrounds. The building's use of Mediterranean elements in an unadorned design reflected the notion of "starved classicism" used in many of Hoover's public works projects; this form of design used themes from classical styles in the plain manner of the Art Deco and Moderne styles.

Murals
The post office also includes two tempera murals, Jedediah Smith Crossing the Merced River by Helen Forbes and Vacheros by Dorothy Puccinelli, which were sponsored by the Section of Painting and Sculpture and painted by the two local artists in 1937.

The U.S. Post Office was added to the National Register of Historic Places on February 10, 1983.

See also 
List of United States post offices

References

External links 

Merced
Government buildings completed in 1933
Buildings and structures in Merced, California
National Register of Historic Places in Merced County, California
United States Post Office Merced
1933 establishments in California